List of metros may refer to:
 List of metropolitan areas
 List of metro systems

See also 
 Metro